Martin White is an English musician, comedian and animator. As well as performing solo with an accordion around the London comedy circuit, White also fronts the Mystery Fax Machine Orchestra and the Karaoke Circus live bands.  He performs jingles regularly in the comedy podcast Answer Me This!.

White co-wrote Psister Psycho – a musical about a killer robotic lesbian nun – with Danielle Ward for the 2007 Edinburgh Festival Fringe. The show was nominated for the Chortle Award for Best Full Length Show 2008.

With Ward, White co-presented Dave Gorman's Sunday morning show on Absolute Radio, where White performed an improvised song, covering as many of the topics discussed on that week's show as possible, accompanied by a range instruments such as the accordion. His contract was not renewed by Absolute, and he left the show in April 2012.

References

External links

Official Mystery Fax Machine Orchestra website
Official Karaoke Circus website
Interview with The Humourdor

English male comedians
English stand-up comedians
Living people
Year of birth missing (living people)
21st-century accordionists